The General Congregation of the Anatolian Turkish Orthodox (in Turkish Umum Anadolu Türk Ortodoksları Cemaatleri) was a pro-Turkish nationalist Orthodox Christian group set up in 1922 and mainly active in the Turkish-speaking, Orthodox Christian Karamanlides population of central Anatolia.  Unlike most Greek Orthodox Christians, they identified themselves as Turkish rather than Greek and supported Kemal Atatürk.

At the time, it had support from the Orthodox Bishop of Havza, as well as numerous other congregations.  There were calls to establish a new Patriarchate for Turkish-speaking Christians with Turkish as the language of worship.

In 1924, the Autocephalous Orthodox Patriarchate of Anatolia was founded in Kayseri by Pavlos Karahisarithis (Papa Eftim), one of its supporters - who was to later introduce Turkish into the liturgy.  Due to the population exchange between Greece and Turkey, most of the congregation of this church were deported to Greece and it is now mainly centred on the family of the original patriarch Papa Eftim I, patriarch of Autocephalous Turkish Orthodox Patriarchate, also known as the Turkish Orthodox Church.

References

Eastern Orthodoxy in Turkey
Autocephalous Turkish Orthodox Patriarchate